Belkofski (Taxtamax̂ in Aleut) is an unincorporated community and Alaska Native Village Statistical Area (ANVSA) in the Aleutians East Borough in Alaska. It has been uninhabited since the 1980s, reporting a population of zero in 1990, 2000 and 2010.

Location 
Belkofski is on a point at the eastern end of the Alaska Peninsula, 12 miles southeast of King Cove.

History 
Russians originally invaded Aleuts at Belkofski in 1823 to harvest sea otters in the area; at its height, it was the area's most important village. It was called "S(elo) Belkovskoe" from "belka," meaning "squirrel." In the 1880s, three stores were constructed, which were stocked with goods from San Francisco. There was a Russian Orthodox Holy Resurrection church built at that time as well. When the sea otter population diminished, so did the population. The economy switched to trapping wild game, and many of Belkofski’s inhabitants would move to the neighboring communities of Sand Point, Alaska and King Cove. The final few inhabitants vacated Belkofski for King Cove in the 1980s, bringing everything with them and establishing a new Orthodox Church.

The village’s abandoned buildings reportedly burned down in 2013.

Demographics

Belkofski first appeared on the 1880 U.S. Census as the unincorporated village of Belkovsky with 268 residents (making it the 25th largest community in the Alaska Territory). It appeared as "Belkovsky" in 1890, as Belkofski Village in 1900, it did not report in 1910, and as Belkofski from 1920-1970, with the exception of 1940 when it was erroneously reported as "Balkofski." Beginning in 1980, it was classified as an "Alaska Native Village" and from 1990 through 2010 censuses as an Alaska Native Village Statistical Area (ANVSA), but on the last three censuses has reported a population of zero.

Climate 
The area is in a maritime climate zone.

Elevation 

References

External links

 www.alaska.hometownlocator.com
 www.awrta.org
 Pictures from Belkofski, Alaska by Eubank, William R.

1823 establishments in North America
Populated coastal places in Alaska on the Pacific Ocean
Populated places established in 1823
Road-inaccessible communities of Alaska
Unincorporated communities in Aleutians East Borough, Alaska
Ghost towns in Alaska
Towns in the United States